Quontic is a U.S.-based bank headquartered in Manhattan, New York City. Quontic has additional locations in Astoria, New York; Melville, New York; Flushing, New York; and Miami, Florida. Though the bank offers traditional branch, in-person banking, it has gained media attention for its mobile banking app, home loans and reverse mortgages.

History
In late 2009, real estate developer and entrepreneur Steven Schnall bought Golden First Bank; a small, troubled bank in Great Neck, New York with $24 million in assets. Terms of the sale allowed Schnall to buy the bank with a clean balance sheet. Schnall assembled a new team, injected fresh capital, and renamed it "Quontic Bank." In March 2011, Quontic opened a second branch in the Astoria, Queens neighborhood of New York City Later in 2011, it shuttered the Great Neck location and moved its headquarters to Astoria. Since its humble beginnings, Quontic has relocated its headquarters to Manhattan, New York, in Rockefeller Plaza.  Quontic continues to operate a bank branch in Astoria. Though Quontic had expanded its offices to states such as Georgia, New Jersey, and Massachusetts,  it now has locations in just 2 states: Florida and New York.

Locations

New York
Quontic was founded in New York and headquartered in the Astoria, Queens neighborhood of New York City. The Astoria location has a full-service branch and home mortgage office, which has gained media attention for its lending to Queens' large immigrant community.

Quontic operated a home mortgage office in Jericho, Long Island before moving to Melville in October 2016.

Florida
Quontic operates a home mortgage office in Coral Gables, a city southwest of Downtown Miami.

References 

Economy of New York (state)
Economy of New York City
Banks based in New York City